Qingyunpu District, is one of 6 urban districts of the prefecture-level city of Nanchang, the capital of Jiangxi Province, China. It is the location of Nanchang Qingyunpu Airport.

Administrative divisions
Qingyunpu District is divided into 5 subdistricts and 1 town:

5 subdistricts

1 town
 Qingyunpu

References

External links

Nanchang
County-level divisions of Jiangxi